Founded in 1964, the Chicago Lions Rugby Football Club is a USA Rugby club based in Chicago, Illinois, United States.

The Chicago Lions namesake is taken from the two large lion statues that guard the entrance to the Art Institute of Chicago Building.

Sponsorship
Notable sponsors include Athletico Physical Therapy, Oakmark International Funds, and CPH and Associates.

Notable players
The following is a list of former and current Lions players and coaches that have earned caps for international tests:

Niue
Stephen Tapuosi, one international cap

Ireland
Paul McNaughton, fifteen international caps

England
Gary Wilson, two international caps

South Africa
Kitch Christie, coached the 1995 Rugby World Cup winning Springboks
Willie Kahts
Harry Viljoen, coached the 2001 Springboks

United States

Andre Blom, fullback/wing, thirteen international caps
John Burke, flanker, two international caps
Phillipus "Thabu" Eloff, centre, forty-four international caps
Paul Emerick, centre, thirty-five international caps
Scott "Beaver" Jones, centre, one international cap
Christian Long, lock, one international cap
Jeremy Nash, fullback, two international caps
Eric Helbig, Wing, three international caps
Andrew McGarry, prop, two international caps
Eric Reed, lock/flanker, seven international caps
Dave Williams, halfback, seven international caps

References

External links
 

1964 establishments in Illinois
Rugby clubs established in 1964
Lions